Dalles may refer to:

 The Dalles, Oregon, a city in the U.S.
 The Dalles Dam
 Fort Dalles
 The Dalles High School
 The Dalles Municipal Airport, or Columbia Gorge Regional Airport 
 Dalles Formation, a geologic formation
 Dalles of the St. Croix River, in Minnesota and Wisconsin,  U.S.
 Niisaachewan Anishinaabe Nation, also known as the Dalles First Nation, an Ojibway First Nation in Canada
 The Dalles 38C, an Ojibway First Nation reserve in Kenora District, Ontario, Canada
 John A. Dalles, American clergyman and hymnwriter

See also

 Dallas (disambiguation)
 Dulles (disambiguation)
 Dalle, a surname
 Dalles des Morts ('Death Rapids'), a former stretch of the Columbia River in Canada